Simon Hew Dalrymple Fanshawe OBE (born 26 December 1956, in Devizes, England) is a writer and broadcaster. He contributes frequently to British newspapers, television and radio. He is also now a consultant and non-executive director of public and private organisations. Fanshawe was one of the founders of the LGBT charity Stonewall. He won the Perrier Comedy Award in 1989. In 2019, he became one of the supporters of the initialive that led to the formation of the LGB Alliance.

Career
Fanshawe first came to public attention as a comedian in the early 1980s. In 1984, he appeared on the Channel 4 comedy sketch/stand-up show The Entertainers, which showcased up-and-coming comedy talent, and later that year appeared in his comedy act Three of a Different Kind at the Edinburgh Festival. Following a nomination in 1987, he later won the prestigious Perrier Comedy Award in 1989. He had a stint as a presenter on the BBC television programme That's Life! in 1990.

Alongside working in comedy, Fanshawe has been a frequent contributor on a variety of subjects from arts to politics in newspapers and on many BBC radio and TV programmes. His BBC Radio 4 profile light-heartedly describes him as a "media tart".

Fanshawe has been involved in many community and campaigning groups and public bodies – often as a board member. He led the successful campaign to make Brighton and Hove a city in 2000. He was the chairman of the board for the Brighton Festival Fringe and is on the board of the Edinburgh Fringe. He founded and chaired the economic strategy body of his home town, The Brighton & Hove Economic Partnership. He was chairman of Brighton & Hove Local Radio Ltd from 1996 to 2000, when the company was acquired by Forever Broadcasting.

In 2006, Fanshawe made the documentary The Trouble with Gay Men, shown on BBC Three.

Fanswhawe was a co-founder of the LGBT charity Stonewall.

In 2007, Fanshawe presented the first programme in the BBC's Building Britain series, concentrating his attentions on the key role of developers in making cities over the last two centuries.

In 2017, Fanshawe presented the BBC documentary Brighton: 50 Years of Gay in which he examined the landmark Sexual Offences Act 1967, which legalised male homosexual acts in the UK, and its effect on the population of the City of Brighton.

In 2019, he publicly broke with Stonewall due to their "intolerance of disagreement and discussion" and helped found the LGB Alliance later that year.

Personal life

Fanshawe was educated at two independent boarding schools: Chafyn Grove School in Salisbury in Wiltshire, and Marlborough College in Wiltshire, followed by the University of Sussex near Brighton, where he studied law. He is now chair of the university's governing council. He was appointed OBE in the 2013 New Year Honours for services to higher education.

Fanshawe lives in the Kemp Town area of Brighton.

Newspapers and magazines
Fanshawe has contributed articles to the following publications:
 The Guardian
 The Observer
 The Sunday Times
 The Daily Telegraph
 Evening Standard
 Time Out
 Punch

Radio
Fanshawe has been a presenter or contributor on the following radio programmes:
 Kaleidoscope
 Sunday Brunch
 Fanshawe on Five
 The Reference Library
 Live From London
 Fanshawe Gets to the Bottom Of...
 Loose Ends
 The Motion Show

Television
 That's Life!, a BBC television light entertainment series. A humour contributor, for one series only, in 1990.
 Thames Roadshow
 Cabaret at the Jongleurs
 Brighton: 50 Years of Gay (2017)

Bibliography

References

External links
 Fanshawe's website
 Official site for The Done Thing
 Blog for The Done Thing
 Biography on BBC Radio 4 site

People from Brighton and Hove
1956 births
Living people
British gay writers
English LGBT writers
People educated at Chafyn Grove School
People educated at Marlborough College
Alumni of the University of Sussex
British republicans
Officers of the Order of the British Empire
People from Devizes